Raoul Bushman is a fictional character appearing in American comic books published by Marvel Comics. He is depicted as an enemy of Marc Spector, whose secret identity is Moon Knight. He is interchangeably also known as Roald Bushman.

Publication history
Bushman's first appearance was in Moon Knight #1 (Nov. 1980), and he was created by Doug Moench.

The character subsequently appears in Moon Knight #9-10 (July–Aug. 1981), Marc Spector: Moon Knight #1-3 (June–Aug. 1989), #11-16 (Feb.–July 1990), #37 (April 1992), Moon Knight: Resurrection War #1 (Jan. 1998), #3-4 (March–April 1998), Moon Knight vol. 3 #2-3 (July–Aug. 2006), #6 (Nov. 2006) and #10 (July 2007) and Vengeance of the Moon Knight #3-6 (Nov. 2009-March 2010).

Bushman returns during the corporate-wide relaunch Marvel Legacy which starts with Moon Knight issue #188, written by Max Bemis, who also suffers from mental health disorders, and drawn by Jacen Burrows.

Bushman received an entry in the Official Handbook of the Marvel Universe Update '89 #1.

Fictional character biography
Bushman worked as a mercenary in Sudan with Spector as his former right-hand man. Bushman and his men came upon Dr. Peter Alraune and his daughter Marlene Alraune and attempted to kill both in order to steal the Egyptian gold Alraune had discovered. When Spector, disgusted by Bushman's senseless murder, tries to save Alraune and his daughter, Bushman kills Peter Alraune, then beats Spector to the brink of death. It is while lying near death that Spector encounters the spirit of Khonshu and adopts the identity of Moon Knight. In this new guise, Spector defeats Bushman. He also rescues the Alraunes and their discovered Egyptian gold. Eventually Moon Knight confronts Bushman and carves off his face before killing him.

Return
Bushman is supernaturally resurrected by the criminal overlord The Hood using Dormammu's powers. He recruits Ghost Rider foe Scarecrow, to break into Ravencroft. They lobotomize the patients to create an army. Moon Knight is able to stop the army and tracks down Bushman. Khonshu demands that Moon Knight sacrifice Bushman for him, but Moon Knight refuses to kill him again. Bushman is last seen in a straight jacket in a mental asylum.

Raoul Bushman resurfaces, albeit as a corpulent crack dealer, and meets "Patient 86" who became an avatar of Ra called the Sun King. They come up with a plot to kill Moon Knight. To accomplish the plans to kill Moon Knight, Bushman and Sun King went to Marlene Alraune's house and discovered that she and Jake Lockley's aspect of Moon Knight had a child together, much to the shock of Marc Spector and Steven Grant. He kidnaps Marlene, and forces Moon Knight to board a ship to an island showdown with Sun king. During the boat ride Raoul gets two fingers cut off and eventually abandons Sun King when he is defeated by Moon Knight.

Powers and abilities
Bushman has no superhuman powers, but he is an expert in guerrilla warfare and highly proficient in the use of most conventional firearms. He has peak human physical strength and is highly athletic and agile. He sometimes uses metal teeth so that in hand-to-hand combat he can draw his enemy in close to him to tear the enemy apart with his teeth.

In other media
Bushman is featured as an enemy in the Moon Knight virtual pinball game for Pinball FX 2 released by Zen Studios.

References

Characters created by Bill Sienkiewicz
Characters created by Doug Moench
Comics characters introduced in 1980
Fictional characters with disfigurements
Fictional mercenaries in comics
Fictional murdered people
Marvel Comics male supervillains
Marvel Comics martial artists
Marvel Comics supervillains